Cychropsis hartmanni is a species of ground beetle in the subfamily of Carabinae. It was described by Deuve & J. Schmidt in 2005.

References

hartmanni
Beetles described in 2005